The Shulgin Rating Scale (or "quantitative potency scale") is a simple scale for reporting the subjective effect of psychoactive substances at a given dosage, and at a given time. The system was developed for research purposes by the American biochemist Alexander Shulgin, and published with co-authors Ann Shulgin and Peyton Jacob, III, in a 1986 issue of the journal Methods and Findings in Experimental and Clinical Pharmacology. It was later described in the Shulgins' popular 1991 book PIHKAL: A Chemical Love Story.

PIHKAL Glossary excerpts

Usage
Shulgin Ratings typically include three components. An identification of the chemical being ingested, a dosage, and a descriptive narrative including the ratings themselves used to describe various moments in time. The chemical itself must be clearly identified, preferably using chemical nomenclature, as opposed to popular or "street" names. The dosage must be known and communicated, as substances may result in wildly different ratings at different doses. The rating itself gives a comparable value relating to the subjective intensity of the experience, including auditory, visual, emotional, mental, physical and other sensory effects. The narrative may include various Shulgin ratings, noting the time to achieve various levels, for instance:

References

External links
PIHKAL at Erowid
"A Protocol for the Evaluation of New Psychoactive Drugs in Man" in Meth and Find Exptl Clin Pharmacol 1986;8(5):313-320.

Psychedelic drug research